Teachers Only is an American sitcom on NBC that centered on the faculty of a Los Angeles high school who spent a lot of time in the teacher's lounge, where the students were not allowed. Following a short first season, the show was completely overhauled, with only stars Lynn Redgrave and Norman Fell returning.

Production
Lynn Redgrave had starred on CBS's House Calls for two seasons, but she was replaced by Sharon Gless in the third. It was heavily reported that she was fired for breastfeeding her newborn at work, but the network claimed it was a budget dispute (Redgrave's then-husband/manager later admitted both parts were true). Eager to cash in on the publicity and cater to her every need, third-place network NBC quickly offered her this series. In a similar situation, Norman Fell had shot to fame overnight as the crotchety landlord on ABC's Three's Company, but he found himself at odds with the network after being exiled to the short-lived spinoff, The Ropers. Cast as the young science teacher was Adam Arkin, then best-known as the son of Alan Arkin. The rest of the cast was populated by little-known character actors. Series creator Aaron Ruben brought along writing veterans from his most recent endeavor, The Stockard Channing Show (which suffered a notably similar fate, being a revamped version of Channing's previous sitcom, Just Friends).

When it returned in early 1983, Redgrave and Fell retained their character names, but everything else had changed. Redgrave switched occupations from English teacher to guidance counselor, all hints of an eventual romance between her and Fell were nixed, and his character is revealed to have been carrying on in a longtime secret affair with his secretary, portrayed by Jean Smart. This was Smart's first television experience, and although her agent remarked, "You really don’t know your ass from apple butter, do you?," she was given the plumpest role of the new ensemble.

Tim Reid simultaneously replaced Arkin's science teacher (also named Michael) and Van Nessa Clark's token black character. Teresa Ganzel was a regular in skits on The Tonight Show Starring Johnny Carson, and his company produced this series, which led to her involvement. Ganzel was at a moment of particular success, having recently been showcased as the object of male desire in the 1982 film The Toy, which was cited in NBC advertisements. Originally, Joel Brooks costarred as the music teacher, but his character was dropped after eight episodes and he was scrubbed from the opening credits. However, the network did not broadcast the episodes in production order, so he appeared all throughout the season. Although they still explored dark themes such as violence against women and racial profiling, the new writing staff generally kept a lighter tone.

The Commodores' song "Reach High," which appeared on the band's compilation album "All the Great Hits", was touted as the show's second season theme song, and the band was prominently listed in the closing credits as an instrumental version played. This cross-promotional media gimmick proved to be fruitless, as the show flopped and the single failed to make it onto the music charts.

Series overview
The first season is set at Millard Fillmore High, and includes the principal, vice-principal, secretary, janitor, English, French, and science teachers. The second season is set at Woodrow Wilson High, and includes the principal, secretary, guidance counselor, coach, science, English, music, and history teachers.

Cast and characters

Season 1
 Lynn Redgrave as Diana Swanson - The British English teacher exudes an air of dignified sophistication without condescension. Diana is a warm people-person who takes a hands-on approach, not only with her pupils but in all of her endeavors. She's divorced and teaching hasn't left much time for a love life, although she has the occasional date.
 Norman Fell as Ben Cooper The principal is good with numbers, having worked his way up from being a math teacher. Mr. Cooper prefers to keep the faculty at arm's length to make it less difficult in the instances when he has to act as a superior. At home, he has a nagging wife to contend with, and there are indications that he's attracted to Diana (who outright admits her attraction to him to the other teachers).
 Adam Arkin as Michael Dreyfuss - A 5-year veteran at Millard Fillmore, the young science teacher is a dorky, big-hearted bachelor who's close with Diana, although there are no indications of romantic feelings between them. Mr. Dreyfuss is quick-witted, passionate about science, and loves to see his students' faces light up when they learn something new. 
 Van Nessa Clarke as Gwen Edwards - The French teacher is a sassy Black lady who thrives by spouting off quips en Francaise. Virtually nothing is revealed about her as a person over the course of the season.
 Norman Bartold as Mr. Brody - Vice-Principal and unrepentant suck-up Brody the Toadie has held his position since the early 1960s. A believer in traditional values, the petty, pompous, and persnickety Mr. Brody still lives with his mother and is married to his job. One of his few responsibilities is creating staff questionnaires—and he's prolific at it, which aggravates the entire faculty. 
 Richard Karron as Mr. Pafko - The janitor is an oddball who does as little work as possible, and he lurks in the background, ready to interject something bizarre or profound into a conversation.
 Kit McDonough as Lois - The school secretary is a busybody with her finger on the pulse of the latest gossip. In her personal life, she's constantly on the hunt for Mr. Right.

Season 2
 Lynn Redgrave as Diana Swanson - The guidance counselor immigrated from Britain to the United States in the early 1960s and married a debonaire grifter, although she eventually built up the courage to leave him, and later coerced a confession from him for the police. Her best friend is Sam, and she gradually becomes frenemies with Shari, whose secret she keeps. Diana loves her students and fights for their well-being.
 Norman Fell as Ben Cooper - A World War II veteran, the Principal has been hardened by life and the death of his wife. He and his secretary, Shari, have been having an affair for years, but he's opted to keep his love hidden for fear that it will ruin their business reputations. Mr. Cooper is quite adept at juggling his responsibilities at the office, but he often comes across as gruff, and his decisions aren't always popular.
 Jean Smart as Shari, - The principal's secretary and longtime mistress is the resident antagonist, who's shamelessly condescending and bitchy toward everyone. However, she genuinely loves Mr. Cooper and softens toward Diana, who is her occasional-confidant.
 Tim Reid as Michael Horne - The science teacher is proclaimed to be the most beloved teacher by the entire student body. Michael is down-to-earth, loves technology, and shows compassion for everyone he meets. 
 Steve Ryan as Spud Le Boone - The boys gym coach is dimwitted but amiable. Michael is his best friend, and he's been married to his wife Scooter for over a decade.
 Teresa Ganzel as Samantha Keating - The English teacher is also Diana's next-door-neighbor and best friend. Sam is sweet but shallow, and obsessed with material possessions.
 Joel Brooks as Barney Betelman - The music teacher is a lovelorn sadsack tech geek who's so concerned for his own safety that he's turned his apartment into a booby-trapped fortress.

Recurring
 Steffen Zacharias as Mr. Cochrane - The history teacher appears whenever a doddering old man is required for a brief moment of comic relief.
Brian Robbins as Vinnie Minetti - A playful, rebellious young student who passionately professes his love for Diana.
Larry B. Scott as Gene - A wisecracking student who's a member of the shop class and a victim of racial profiling.

Episodes

Season 1 (1982)

Season 2 (1983)

Broadcast history
Teachers Only had a two-month tryout on Wednesday nights in April and June 1982, replacing the Tony Randall vehicle Love, Sidney. It was rerun on Thursday nights in September, just prior to the start of the new TV season. The second season of Love, Sidney was relegated to Saturday nights, where it struggled through December and was replaced by Taxi, which also failed to draw an audience during a brief stint before Teachers Only took over the low-rated time slot. Second season ratings plummeted, and Teachers Only vanished from NBC after the final episode was broadcast.

The complete series was made available for streaming on the CTV Television Network's "Throwback" section in January 2021.

U.S. television ratings

See also

References

Sources

 
 
  Note: Steve Ryan is uncredited and Joel Brooks is credited with Ryan's character name. This authoratative tome's blunder has been duplicated on countless websites and in other books.

External links
 

1982 American television series debuts
1983 American television series endings
1980s American high school television series
1980s American sitcoms
1980s American workplace comedy television series
NBC original programming
English phrases
Television series about educators
Television shows set in Los Angeles
English-language television shows
Television series by Carson Productions